Pride of the Bowery is a black-and-white 1940 film and the fourth installment in the East Side Kids series.  It was directed by Joseph H. Lewis and produced by Sam Katzman.  It was released by Monogram Pictures on December 15, 1940.

Plot
When Muggs refuses to train for the Golden Gloves match unless he has his own private camp in the country, Danny placates his pal by enlisting members of the Vassey Street Boys' Club in the Civilian Conservation Corps. Arriving at the camp, Muggs refuses to accept the authority of Allen, the leader of the boys, and treats the facility as if it was his own private property. Later, Muggs has a chance to demonstrate his true nature when he risks his own life to save Al from being crushed by a falling tree. The camp captain praises Muggs for his courage, and as a reward, Muggs requests a boxing match with Al. Norton, a small-time boxing promoter, comes to watch the fight, which ends in a draw. Furious at the outcome, Muggs refuses to shake his opponent's hand, an act which earns the enmity of the other boys. When the captain fails to remove the chip from Muggs' shoulder, his daughter, Elaine, tries to reform him through kindness. Meanwhile, Willie, one of the boys, steals one hundred dollars from the camp cash box and then lies to Muggs, telling him that he needed the money for his poor aunt. To get the money back for Willie, Muggs agrees to a fight arranged by promoter Norton. Although he takes a beating in the ring, Muggs earns the one hundred dollars. While returning the money to the cash box, Muggs is caught and accused of theft. He refuses to inform on Willie, and instead plans to run away. But Danny then forces Willie to tell the truth, proving Muggs is innocent.

Cast

The East Side Kids
Leo Gorcey as Muggs McGinnis
Bobby Jordan as Danny Graham
Donald Haines as Skinny
David Gorcey as Peewee

Additional cast
Sunshine Sammy Morrison as Scruno
Bobby Stone as Willie
Eugene Francis as Algy (uncredited)
Kenneth Howell as  Allen
Mary Ainslee as Elaine White
Kenneth Harlan as Captain Jim White
Nick Stuart as Thumb Butte Ranger
Lloyd Ingraham as Camp Doctor
Steven Clensos as Man (uncredited)
Carleton Young as Norton (uncredited)

Crew
 Director: Joseph H. Lewis
 Writer: William Lively
 Story: Steven Clensos
 Producer: Sam Katzman
 Original Music: Johnny Lange, Lew Porter
 Cinematography: Robert E. Cline
 Editor: Robert Golden
 Set Decoration: Fred Preble
 Production Management: Robert Emmett Tansey
 Second Unit Director/Assistant Director: Arthur Hammond, Herman Pett
 Sound Recordist: Glen Glenn Sound

Production
Pride of the Bowery was released in the United Kingdom under the title Here We Go Again which was the final line of the film.

Despite referencing the previous film with having Muggs take up boxing, there are noticeable continuity gaps (mainly with Scruno as a CCC member, rather than an East Side Kid).

Despite only having a small cameo, East Side Kid Eugene Francis was contractually obligated to appear in this film.

Filmed on location in Arizona.

Bobby Stone's first East Side Kids film. Stone would initially alternate between playing East Side Kid members and villains. By 1942, he became a full-fledged East Side Kid.

References

External links
 

1940 films
American black-and-white films
1940s English-language films
Films directed by Joseph H. Lewis
Monogram Pictures films
Films produced by Sam Katzman
Films with screenplays by George H. Plympton
East Side Kids